The 2007 Atlantic hurricane season was an event in the annual tropical cyclone season in the north Atlantic Ocean. A slightly above-average Atlantic hurricane season, September had a record-tying eight storms, although the strength and duration of most of the storms was low. Also, for only the second time in recorded history, an Atlantic hurricane, Felix, and an eastern Pacific hurricane, Henriette, made landfall on the same day.

The season officially began on June 1, 2007, and ended on November 30, 2007, dates that conventionally delimit the period of each year when most tropical cyclones develop in the Atlantic basin. The season's first storm, Subtropical Storm Andrea, developed from an extratropical cyclone that formed on May 6, and the last, Tropical Storm Olga, dissipated on December 11. Altogether, there were 15 named tropical storms during the 2007 season. Six storms attained hurricane strength with two intensifying further into major hurricanes.

This timeline includes information that was not operationally released, meaning that data from post-storm reviews by the National Hurricane Center, such as a storm that was not operationally warned upon, has been included. This timeline documents tropical cyclone formations, strengthening, weakening, landfalls, extratropical transitions, and dissipations during the season.

By convention, meteorologists use one time zone when issuing forecasts and making observations: Coordinated Universal Time (UTC), and also use the 24-hour clock (where 00:00 = midnight UTC). The National Hurricane Center uses both UTC and the time zone where the center of the tropical cyclone is currently located. The time zones utilized (east to west) prior to 2020 were: Atlantic, Eastern, and Central. In this timeline, all information is listed by UTC first with the respective regional time included in parentheses. Additionally, figures for maximum sustained winds and position estimates are rounded to the nearest 5 units (knots, miles, or kilometers), following the convention used in the National Hurricane Center's products. Direct wind observations are rounded to the nearest whole number. Atmospheric pressures are listed to the nearest millibar and nearest hundredth of an inch of mercury.

Timeline

May
May 9

2 a.m.

May 10
8 a.m. EDT (1200 UTC) –  Subtropical Storm Andrea weakens into a subtropical depression.

May 11
2 a.m. EDT (0600 UTC May 11) –  Subtropical Depression Andrea degenerates into a remnant low.

June
June 1
12 a.m. EDT (0400 UTC) –  The 2007 Atlantic hurricane season officially begins.
8 a.m. EDT (1200 UTC) –  A tropical depression forms just northwest of the western tip of Cuba.
2 p.m. EDT (1800 UTC) – The tropical depression near Cuba strengthens into Tropical Storm Barry.

June 2
10 a.m. EDT (1400 UTC) –  Tropical Storm Barry weakens into a tropical depression as it makes landfall near Tampa Bay with  winds.
8 p.m. EDT (0000 UTC June 3) –  Tropical Depression Barry becomes extratropical.

July
July 30
8 p.m.

July 31
2 a.m. EDT (0600 UTC) –  Tropical Depression Three is upgraded to Tropical Storm Chantal.

August

August 1
2 a.m. EDT (0600 UTC) –  Tropical Storm Chantal becomes extratropical.

August 13
2 a.m.

August 14
8 a.m. AST (1200 UTC) –  Tropical Depression Four is upgraded to Tropical Storm Dean.
7 p.m. CDT (0000 UTC August 15) –  Tropical Depression Five forms in Central Gulf of Mexico.

August 15
1 p.m. CDT (1800 UTC) – Tropical Depression Five is upgraded to Tropical Storm Erin.

August 16
2 a.m. AST (0600 UTC) – Tropical Storm Dean is upgraded to Hurricane Dean.
5:30 a.m.
7 a.m. CDT (1200 UTC) – Tropical Storm Erin is downgraded to a tropical depression.
8 a.m. AST (1200 UTC) – Hurricane Dean is upgraded to a Category 2 hurricane.

August 17
7 a.m. CDT (1200 UTC) – Tropical Depression Erin is downgraded to a remnant low about 50 nautical miles south of San Angelo, Texas.
2 p.m. EDT (1800 UTC) – Hurricane Dean is upgraded to a Category 3 hurricane, becoming the first major hurricane of the season.
8 p.m. EDT (0000 UTC August 18) – Hurricane Dean is upgraded to a Category 4 hurricane.

August 18
2 a.m. EDT (0600 UTC) – Hurricane Dean is upgraded to a Category 5 hurricane.
2 p.m. EDT (1800 UTC) – Hurricane Dean is downgraded to a Category 4 hurricane.

August 20

8 p.m. EDT (0000 UTC August 21) – Hurricane Dean is re-upgraded to a Category 5 hurricane.

August 21
3:30 a.m. CDT (0830 UTC) – Hurricane Dean makes landfall near Majahual, Mexico with  winds.

August 22
c. 11:30 a.m. CDT (1630 UTC) – Hurricane Dean is again upgraded to a Category 2 hurricane.
11:30 a.m. CDT (1630 UTC) – Hurricane Dean makes its second landfall, near Tecolutla, Veracruz with  winds.

7 p.m. CDT (0000 UTC August 23) – Hurricane Dean is downgraded to a tropical depression inland over Mexico.

August 23
1 a.m. CDT (0600 UTC) – Tropical Depression Dean dissipates inland over Mexico.

August 31
8 a.m. AST (1200 UTC) – Tropical Depression Six forms east of the Windward Islands.
8 p.m. AST (0000 UTC September 1) – Tropical Depression Six is upgraded to Tropical Storm Felix.

September
September 1
4:45 a.m. AST (0845 UTC) – Tropical Storm Felix makes landfall on Grenada with  winds.
8 p.m. AST (0000 UTC September 2) – Tropical Storm Felix is upgraded to Hurricane Felix.

September 2

2 a.m. AST (0600 UTC) – Hurricane Felix is upgraded to a Category 2 hurricane.
2 p.m. AST (1800 UTC) – Hurricane Felix is upgraded to a Category 4 hurricane.

September 3
2 a.m. AST (0600 UTC) – Hurricane Felix is upgraded to the second Category 5 hurricane of the season.

September 4
8 a.m. EDT (1200 UTC) – Hurricane Felix makes landfall near Punta Gorda, Nicaragua with  winds.
8 p.m. AST (0000 UTC September 5) – Hurricane Felix is downgraded to a tropical storm.

September 5
2 a.m. CDT (0600 UTC) – Tropical Storm Felix is downgraded to a tropical depression.
8 a.m. CDT (1200 UTC) – Tropical Depression Felix is downgraded to a remnant low.

September 7
8 p.m. EDT (0000 UTC September 8) – Subtropical Storm Gabrielle forms  South-East of Cape Lookout, North Carolina.

September 8
2 p.m. EDT (1800 UTC) – Subtropical Storm Gabrielle becomes Tropical Storm Gabrielle.

September 9
11:30 a.m. EDT (1530 UTC) – Tropical Storm Gabrielle makes landfall near the Cape Lookout National Seashore with  winds.

September 10
2 a.m. EDT (0600 UTC) – Tropical Storm Gabrielle is downgraded to a tropical depression.

September 11
8 a.m. EDT (1200 UTC) – Tropical Depression Gabrielle dissipates.

September 12
8 a.m. EDT (1200 UTC) – Tropical Depression Eight forms east of the Lesser Antilles.
8 a.m. EDT (1200 UTC) – Tropical Storm Humberto forms in the Gulf of Mexico, southeast of Houston, Texas.
September 13
1 a.m. CDT (0600 UTC) – Tropical Storm Humberto is upgraded to Hurricane Humberto.
2 a.m. AST (0600 UTC) – Tropical Depression Eight is upgraded to Tropical Storm Ingrid.
2 a.m. CDT (0700 UTC) – Hurricane Humberto makes landfall just east of High Island, Texas with  winds.
1 a.m. CDT (1800 UTC) – Hurricane Humberto is downgraded to a tropical storm.
7 p.m. CDT (0000 UTC September 14) – Tropical Storm Humberto is downgraded to a tropical depression.

September 14
7 p.m. CDT (0600 UTC) – Tropical Depression Humberto is downgraded to a low.

September 15
2 p.m. AST (1800 UTC) – Tropical Storm Ingrid is downgraded to a tropical depression.

September 17
2 a.m. AST (0600 UTC) – Tropical Depression Ingrid is downgraded to a remnant low.

September 21

7 a.m. CDT (1200 UTC) – Subtropical Depression Ten forms in the Gulf of Mexico, south of the Florida Panhandle.
1 p.m. CDT (1800 UTC) – Subtropical Depression Ten is reclassified as Tropical Depression Ten.
7 p.m. CDT (0000 UTC September 22) – Tropical Depression Ten makes landfall near Fort Walton Beach, Florida with  winds.

September 22
1 a.m. CDT (0600 UTC) – Tropical Depression Ten degenerates to a remnant low.
7 p.m. CDT (0000 UTC September 23) – Subtropical Depression Eleven forms in the open Atlantic Ocean.

September 23
1 a.m. CDT (0600 UTC) – Subtropical Depression Eleven is upgraded to Subtropical Storm Jerry.
8 p.m. AST (0000 UTC September 24) – Subtropical Storm Jerry is reclassified as Tropical Storm Jerry.

September 24
2 p.m. AST (1800 UTC) – Tropical Storm Jerry is downgraded to a tropical depression.
8 p.m. AST (0000 UTC September 25) – Tropical Depression Jerry dissipates.
8 p.m. AST (0000 UTC September 25) – Tropical Depression Twelve forms east of the southern Windward Islands.

September 25
2 a.m. AST (0600 UTC) – Tropical Depression Twelve is upgraded to Tropical Storm Karen.
1 p.m. CDT (1800 UTC) – Tropical Depression Thirteen forms east of Tampico in the southern Gulf of Mexico.

September 26
8 a.m. AST (1200 UTC) – Tropical Storm Karen strengthens into Hurricane Karen.
8 p.m. AST (0000 UTC September 27) – Hurricane Karen weakens to a tropical storm.

September 27
7 a.m. CDT (1200 UTC) – Tropical Depression Thirteen is upgraded to Tropical Storm Lorenzo.
7 p.m. CDT (0000 UTC September 28) – Tropical Storm Lorenzo is upgraded to Hurricane Lorenzo.

September 28
12 a.m. CDT (0500 UTC) – Hurricane Lorenzo makes landfall Tecolutla, Veracruz, Mexico with  winds.
2 a.m. AST (0600 UTC) – Tropical Depression Fourteen forms southwest of Cape Verde.
7 a.m. CDT (1200 UTC) – Hurricane Lorenzo is downgraded to a tropical depression.
7 p.m. CDT (0000 UTC September 29) – Tropical Depression Lorenzo dissipates inland Mexico.

September 29
2 a.m. AST (0600 UTC) – Tropical Depression Fourteen is upgraded to Tropical Storm Melissa.
2 a.m. EDT (0600 UTC) – Tropical Storm Karen is downgraded to a tropical depression.
8 a.m. AST (1200 UTC) – Tropical Depression Karen is downgraded to a low just to the east of the Leeward Islands.

September 30
2 a.m. AST (0600 UTC) – Tropical Storm Melissa is downgraded to a tropical depression.
1 p.m. AST (1800 UTC) – Tropical Depression Melissa degenerates into a remnant low.

October
October 11
8 a.m. AST (1200 UTC) – Tropical Depression Fifteen forms east of Bermuda.

October 12
8 p.m. AST (0000 UTC October 13) – Tropical Depression Fifteen degenerates into a remnant low.

October 27
8 p.m. EDT (0000 UTC October 28) – Tropical Depression Sixteen forms in the central Caribbean Sea.

October 28
8 a.m. EDT (1200 UTC) – Tropical Depression Sixteen strengthens into Tropical Storm Noel.

October 29
3 a.m. EDT (0700 UTC) – Tropical Storm Noel makes its first landfall in Jacmel, Haiti with  winds.

October 30
2 a.m. EDT (0600 UTC) – Tropical Storm Noel makes its second landfall near Guardalavaca, Cuba with  winds.

November

November 1
9:15 a.m.
1:15 a.m.
8 p.m. EDT (0000 UTC November 2) – Tropical Storm Noel strengthens into Hurricane Noel.

November 2
8 p.m EDT (0000 UTC November 3) – Hurricane Noel becomes extratropical.

November 30
11:59 p.m EST (0459 UTC December 1) – The 2007 hurricane season officially ends.

December
December 10
9:45 p.m. AST (0045 UTC December 11) – Subtropical Storm Olga forms north of Puerto Rico.

December 11
2 p.m. AST (1800 UTC) – Subtropical Storm Olga makes landfall in north central Puerto Rico, just west of Vega Baja, with  winds.
2 p.m. AST (1800 UTC) – Subtropical Storm Olga is reclassified as Tropical Storm Olga.
2 p.m. AST (1800 UTC) – Tropical Storm Olga makes landfall just south of Punta Cana, Dominican Republic with  winds.

December 12
1 p.m. EST (1800 UTC) – Tropical Storm Olga weakens to a tropical depression.
7 p.m. EST (0000 UTC December 13) – Tropical Depression Olga degenerates into a remnant low in the Caribbean Sea.

See also

Timeline of the 2007 Pacific hurricane season
Timeline of the 2007 Pacific typhoon season
Timeline of the 2007 North Indian Ocean cyclone season
Timeline of the 2007–08 South-West Indian Ocean cyclone season
Timeline of the 2007–08 South Pacific cyclone season
Timeline of the 2007–08 Australian region cyclone season
Timeline of the 2008–09 South-West Indian Ocean cyclone season
Timeline of the 2008–09 South Pacific cyclone season
Timeline of the 2008–09 Australian region cyclone season

Notes

References

External links
 2007 Tropical Cyclone Advisory Archive, National Hurricane Center and Central Pacific Hurricane Center
 Hurricanes and Tropical Storms – Annual 2007, National Centers for Environmental Information

2007 Atlantic hurricane season
Articles which contain graphical timelines
2007 Atl T